Louise Patricia Browne (born 16 March 1952) is a Trinidadian former cricketer who played as a right-handed batter. She appeared in 6 One Day Internationals for Trinidad and Tobago at the 1973 World Cup, and nine Test matches and two One Day Internationals for the West Indies between 1976 and 1979. She captained Trinidad and Tobago at the 1973 World Cup, and captained the West Indies for their first two international series, against Australia and India. She also played domestic cricket for Trinidad and Tobago.

In the year 2000, Louise was named one of the hundred top sporting personalities of the century in Trinidad and Tobago. In 2011, Louise managed the USA Women's Cricket Team at a World Cup Qualifier in Bangladesh. She was inducted into the Trinidad and Tobago Sports Hall of Fame on November 20, 2015.

She is the 5th of twelve children (8 girls and 4 boys). Two of her sisters, Beverly and Ann, also played international cricket.

References

External links
 

1952 births
Living people
West Indian women cricketers
West Indies women Test cricketers
West Indies women One Day International cricketers
West Indian women cricket captains
Trinidad and Tobago women cricketers
Trinidad and Tobago women cricket captains
Trinidad and Tobago cricket coaches